Thomas de Grey (1680 – 1765) of Merton, Norfolk, was an English landowner and Whig politician who sat in the House of Commons between 1708 and 1727.

Early life

de Grey was baptised on 13 August 1680, the eldest surviving son of William de Grey and his wife Elizabeth Bedingfield, daughter of Thomas Bedingfield of Darsham. He was educated at Bury St Edmunds Grammar School, and was admitted at St John's College, Cambridge on 18 May 1697, aged17. By a marriage settlement dated 10 September 1706, he  married  with £4,500, Elizabeth Windham, daughter of William Windham of Felbrigg, Norfolk. His marriage brought him into connection with many Norfolk Whig families, although his father was a Tory.

Career
de Grey was returned as Whig Member of Parliament for Thetford at the 1708 British general election. He supported the naturalization of the Palatines in 1709, and voted for the impeachment of Dr Sacheverell in 1710.  He did not stand at the 1710 British general election, possibly on grounds of cost, and at the  1713 British general election, declined an invitation by Robert Walpole to stand for Norfolk.

At the 1715 British general election, de Grey was backed by Lord Townshend  as a  Whig candidate for Norfolk  and he won the contest. He voted against the septennial bill of 1716 and joined the opposition (led by Townshend and Robert Walpole) against Lord Cadogan in June 1717. He abstained from the votes on the Peerage Bill and on repealing the Occasional Conformity Act and Schism Act, all in 1719. He did not want to stand again at the 1722 British general election, writing   to Townshend asking:

Townshend did not let him stand down and he won the seat unopposed, but never stood again.

Death and legacy
de Grey died in 1765 and was buried at Merton on 18 December 1765. By his wife, he had two daughters and two surviving sons, Thomas and William.

References

1680 births
1765 deaths
Alumni of St John's College, Cambridge
Members of the Parliament of Great Britain for Thetford
Members of the Parliament of Great Britain for Norfolk
British MPs 1715–1722
British MPs 1722–1727